Cary Lewis Long is an American sculptor, conceptual artist, and former businessman.

Early life and education 
Long was born in 1961 in Bakersfield, California. He studied art and philosophy at the University of California, Berkeley.

Career

Between 1993 and 2008, Long created and operated Nova Express Café, an outer-space and fantasy-themed café and art space in Los Angeles. Much of the decor was fabricated from found objects and second-hand materials. His approach was to integrate direct experience of art with everyday life gestures as to make art widely accessible and egalitarian. Each seating area was fabricated into an imaginative fantasy zone defined by sculptural art. Many performances by poets, musicians and artists were free to the public. The singular appeal of his "walk in sculpture that sells pizza" garnered a devoted interest and following during its existence.

After the closure of Nova Express Café, he began work at his Robot Iguana Studio to produce new works and sculptures.

Personal life 
Long lives in Los Angeles, California.

References

People from Bakersfield, California
American conceptual artists
Sculptors from California
1961 births
Living people
University of California, Berkeley alumni